Özgür Özata (born 17 February 1977) is a Turkish-German actor.

Filmography

Films
 Fern (1997, short)
 Aprilkinder (1998)
 Der Ausbruch (2000, short)
 Poppitz (2002)
 Alim Market (2004, short)
 Counterparts (2007)
 The Moon and Other Lovers (2008)

Television
 Hausmeister Krause – Ordnung muss sein (2007)
 Alles Atze (2007)
 Das Geheimnis meines Vaters (2006)
 Alle lieben Jimmy (2006)
 Marienhof (2006, 2009)
 Ein Fall für zwei (2005)
  (2006)
 Siska (2005)
 König von Kreuzberg (2005)
 Die Kommissarin (2006)
 Leipzig Homicide (2005)
 Zoes Arkadas
 Die schnelle Gerdi (2004)
 Balko (2002)
 Abschnitt 40 (2002)
 Offroad.TV (2001)
 Der Fahnder (2001)
 Die Kumpel (2001)
 Der Superbulle und die Halbstarken (2000)
 My Sweet Home (2001)
 Wolffs Revier (2000)
 Die Verwegene – Kämpfe um deinen Traum (2000)
 Küstenwache (2000)
 Für alle Fälle Stefanie (1999–2000)
  (1999)
 Sperling und der brennende Arm (1998)
 Happy Birthday
 Die Fallers (1995)
 Der Millionenerbe (1993)

Awards
For Aprilkinder:
 1999: Fernsehfilm-Festival Baden-Baden: Special Award
 1999: Filmfestival Max Ophüls Preis: Audience Award

For Sperling und der brennende Arm:
 1998: Filmfest München: VFF TV Movie Award
 1999: Deutscher Fernsehpreis: in vielen Kategorien
 1999: Fernsehfilm-Festival Baden-Baden: Teleplay Award

For My Sweet Home:
 1999: Adolf-Grimme-Preis: Nominierung
 2000: Internationale Filmfestspiele Berlin

For Alim Market:
 2004: Nominierung für den FIRST STEPS Award, Berlin
 2004: Nominierung für den Studio Hamburg Nachwuchspreis
 2004: 1. Preis TV-Design Köln
 2004: Hauptpreis des Int. Festivals B16, Brünn, Çeçenya
 2005: Silver Award (Comedy) des WorldMediaFestivals, Hamburg
 2005: 2. Preis Athens International Film and Video Festival, Ohio
 2005: HDF-Sonderpreis und Nominierung FFA Short Tiger 2005, Filmfest München
 2005: Honorable Mention: Adobe Design Achievement Awards

For Counterparts:
 2007 Cannes - „Quinzaine des Réalisateurs“ (Director's Fortnight), Lobende Erwähnung
 2007 Filmfest München, En İyi Senaryo
 2007 Nominiert für den FIRST STEPS AWARD, En İyi Film
 2007 Europäischen Filmpreis, 2007 Avrupa'da Keşfedilenler
 2007 1. Hachenburger Filmfest, Preis „Der Junge Löwe“ im Forum Nachwuchsfilmer
 2007 Pusan International Film Festival

References

External links

1977 births
People from İskenderun
Turkish male film actors
Turkish male television actors
German male film actors
German male television actors
Turkish emigrants to West Germany
Living people
Male actors from Berlin